Association of Croatian Orthodox Believers, often called Croatian Orthodox Union was a civic association in Croatia that formed for the reestablishment of the Croatian Orthodox Church, an Eastern Orthodox autocephalous church that existed from 1942 to 1945, created by the Ustaše in the Independent State of Croatia.

History 
The association publishes a journal called Hrvatski pravoslavac which features articles discussing religious, historical and political events in Croatia and Bosnia and Herzegovina. One of their main activities is the encouragement of Orthodox population in Croatia to officially declare themselves as Croats. The association marks anniversaries of death of Patriarch Germogen of Croatia and other Croatian Orthodox priests killed by the Yugoslav Partisans in 1945.

Croatian law stipulates that at least 500 members and 5 years of existence are required for a religious organization to be officially registered. According to the 2001 census Croatia had around 200,000 Orthodox believers, the majority of whom are thought to be members of the Serbian Orthodox Church, e.g. ethnic Serbs. The association's main goal is gathering Orthodox believers of Croat ethnicity so that forming a separate Croatian Orthodox Church would become possible.

There were 11,400 Croatian citizens who identified themselves as ethnic Croats of the Orthodox Christian persuasion in the 2001 census, but since they did not identify themselves as members of the Croatian Orthodox Church the foundation of the new organisation is still not possible. Those 11,400 Croats aren't members of any Orthodox Church currently in existence, so if they identified themselves as Croatian Orthodox in the 2011 census the Croatian Orthodox Church could be re-established.

A few Croatian right-wing political parties have expressed support for the association and its goals, including the Croatian Party of Rights and the Croatian Pure Party of Rights. However, members of the Serbian Orthodox Church, Independent Democratic Serb Party, Serb People's Party, Croatian culture minister Božo Biškupić, and President Ivo Josipović have all voiced criticism of the association, describing it and its existence as "a form of promotion of the Ustaše ideology", "an invitation for intolerance towards other Orthodox communities" and an "ominous association which is fundamentally based on the idea of denying other [communities], primarily the Serbian Orthodox Church and ethnic Serbs".

References

Croatian Orthodox Church
Eastern Orthodox organizations
Religious nationalism
Christian organizations established in 2010
2010 establishments in Croatia
2019 disestablishments in Croatia
Religious organizations based in Croatia
Independent Eastern Orthodox denominations